Decticita is a genus of shield-backed katydids in the family Tettigoniidae. There are at least three described species in Decticita.

Species
These three species belong to the genus Decticita:
 Decticita balli Hebard, 1939 (Ball's little shieldback)
 Decticita brevicauda (Caudell, 1907) (short-winged shieldback)
 Decticita yosemite Rentz & Birchim, 1968 (Yosemite shieldback)

References

Further reading

 

Tettigoniinae
Articles created by Qbugbot